The Devil's Resolve is the second full-length album by Finnish progressive death metal band Barren Earth. The album is said to contain even more 1970s progressive influences while keeping the brutality associated with the band. On their website, the band stated that twelve songs were written originally, hinting that bonus tracks may be released on future versions of the album. The Devil's Resolve was released on March 12, 2012.

Track listing

Credits

Band members 
 Mikko Kotamäki – lead vocals
 Olli-Pekka Laine – bass, backing vocals
 Kasper Mårtenson – keyboards, backing vocals
 Janne Perttilä – guitar, backing vocals
 Marko Tarvonen – drums
 Sami Yli-Sirniö – guitar, backing vocals

Production 
 Recorded and produced by Jukka Varmo and Barren Earth at Helsinki’s Sonic Pump Studios.

References 

Barren Earth albums
2012 albums